Arnoldus "Nol" Heijerman (10 October 1940 – 23 January 2015) was a Dutch footballer.

Club career
Heijerman played for HVC and Xerxes, with whom he won promotion to the Eredivisie in 1966 and where he played alongside Ab Fafié, Willem van Hanegem, Rob Jacobs and Eddy Treijtel. He made his debut for Xerxes on 25 August 1963 in a 2–2 Tweede Divisie draw with FC Wageningen.

He joined Sparta for 125,000 guilders in 1967.

Sparta Rotterdam
Dubbed Sparta's Beatle because of his long-haired looks, Heijerman played 223 league games for the Rotterdammers, scoring 64 goals. In the 1967–68 season, he scored 19 goals to become the season's club top goalscorer and he scored 3 goals in 10 European cup matches. He finished his career with a sole season at Excelsior.

In 1971, he won a runners-up medal in the KNVB Cup with Sparta, after losing the Cup final to Ajax.

References

External links
 Obituary - In the Mood 

1940 births
2015 deaths
Footballers from Rotterdam
Association football wingers
Dutch footballers
XerxesDZB players
Sparta Rotterdam players
Excelsior Rotterdam players
Eredivisie players